George Legge, 3rd Earl of Dartmouth KG, PC, FRS (3 October 1755 – 10 November 1810), styled Viscount Lewisham until 1801, was a British politician who sat in the House of Commons  from 1778 to 1784.

Background
George Legge, known from birth as Viscount Lewisham, was born 3 October 1755.
He was the eldest son of William Legge, 2nd Earl of Dartmouth, and Frances Katherine, daughter of Sir Charles Gounter Nicoll. He was the elder brother of Admiral Sir Arthur Kaye Legge and Edward Legge, Bishop of Oxford.

He was educated at Eton College and Christ Church, Oxford, where he matriculated 22 October 1771, and was created M.A. 3 July 1775, and D.C.L. 28 October 1778. At some time during the 1770s he went to Florence as he appears in an important painting by Johann Zoffany which the artist titled the Tribuna of the Uffizi.

He was appointed Lieutenant-Colonel of the Staffordshire Militia on 12 March 1779 and took over as its Colonel in 1781. He resigned the command in 1783 when the regiment was disembodied at the end of the American War of Independence. (His son and successor also became colonel of the regiment in 1812.)

Political career

Lewisham was returned to Parliament for Plymouth in 1778, a seat he held until 1780. In the latter year he was returned for both Horsham and Staffordshire 1784, but chose to represent the latter. He continued to represent this constituency until 1784. From 1783 to 1798 he served as Lord Warden of the Stannaries. He remained out of parliament for the next 17 years, but in 1801 he was summoned to the House of Lords through a writ of acceleration in his father's junior title of Baron Dartmouth. He succeeded his father in the earldom later the same year. Dartmouth served under Henry Addington as President of the Board of Control between 1801 and 1802 and as Lord Steward between 1802 and 1804. From 1804 to 1810 he was Lord Chamberlain under successively Pitt the Younger, Lord Grenville, the Duke of Portland and Spencer Perceval. He was sworn of the Privy Council in 1801 and appointed a Knight of the Garter in 1805. He was also admitted a Fellow of the Royal Society on 3 May 1781 and was the first President of the British Institution in 1805.

Family
Lord Dartmouth married Lady Frances (9 February 1761 – 21 November 1838), daughter of Heneage Finch, 3rd Earl of Aylesford, on 24 September 1782. They had fifteen children:

Hon. Frances Catherine Legge (7 September 1783 – 7 March 1789)
William Legge, 4th Earl of Dartmouth (29 November 1784 – 22 November 1853)
Hon. George Legge (20 February 1786 – 15 October 1789)
Lady Louisa Legge (8 March 1787 – 13 August 1816), married William Bagot, 2nd Baron Bagot, and had issue.
Hon. Heneage Legge (29 February 1788 – 12 December 1844), married Mary Johnstone.
Lady Charlotte Legge (12 February 1789 – 15 June 1877), married in 1816 Very Rev. Hon. George Neville-Grenville (Dean of Windsor), son of Richard Griffin, 2nd Baron Braybrooke, and had issue.
Lady Harriet Legge (7 September 1790 – 11 March 1855), married in 1815 General Hon. Sir Edward Paget, son of Henry Paget, 1st Earl of Uxbridge, and had issue.
Lady Barbara Maria Legge (29 Nov 1791 – 22 April 1840), married in 1820 Francis Parker Newdigate and had issue
Hon. Catherine Charlotte Legge (2 Apr 1793 – 1793)
Lady Georgina Caroline Legge (14 May 1795 – 11 August 1885). She was a lady-in-waiting to Princess Mary, Duchess of Gloucester. 
Lady Mary Legge (3 June 1796 – 8 July 1886)
Lady Anne Legge (14 August 1797 – 24 November 1885)
Hon. Charles Legge (26 January 1799 – 1 November 1821)
General Hon. Arthur Charles Legge (25 June 1800 – 18 May 1890), married first on 1 June 1827 Lady Anne Holroyd (d. 1829), daughter of John Holroyd, 1st Earl of Sheffield, second on 29 August 1837 Caroline Bouwens and had issue.
Hon. Henry Legge (25 Sep 1803 – 13 February 1887), vicar of Lewisham, married on 12 May 1842 Maria Rogers (d. 1890), daughter of Sir Frederick Rogers, 7th Baronet.

Lord Dartmouth died on 10 November 1810, aged 55, and was succeeded in the earldom by his eldest son, William. Lady Dartmouth died on 21 November 1838.

References

Attribution

External links

Legge genealogy

1755 births
1810 deaths
People educated at Eton College
Staffordshire Militia officers
3
Fellows of the Royal Society
Knights of the Garter
Lewisham, George Legge, Viscount
British MPs 1774–1780
British MPs 1780–1784
Members of the Privy Council of Great Britain
George
Presidents of the Board of Control